The 2011–12 Yale Bulldogs men's basketball team represented Yale University during the 2011–12 NCAA Division I men's basketball season. The Bulldogs, led by 13th year head coach James Jones, played their home games at John J. Lee Amphitheater of the Payne Whitney Gymnasium and are members of the Ivy League. They finished the season 19–10, 9–5 in Ivy League play to finish in fourth place. They were invited to the 2012 CollegeInsider.com Tournament where they lost in the first round to Fairfield.

Roster

Schedule

|-
!colspan=9 style=| Regular Season

|-
!colspan=9 style=| CollegeInsider.com Tournament

All-Ivy
The following players earned Ivy League postseason recognition:
Defensive Player of the Year
Reggie Willhite, Yale (Sr., G/F, Elk Grove, Calif.)
 
First Team All-Ivy
Greg Mangano, Yale (Sr., C, Orange, Conn.)
 
Second Team All-Ivy
Reggie Willhite, Yale (Sr., G/F, Elk Grove, Calif.)

References

Yale Bulldogs men's basketball seasons
Yale
Yale
Yale Bulldogs
Yale Bulldogs